Brysis Coleman — born Grace Brysis Noah — was an American screenwriter active during the late 1920s in Hollywood. She wrote a string of Westerns for director J.P. McGowan.

Biography 
Brysis was born in Kansas City, Kansas, to Logan Noah and Grace Mulligan. She graduated from Lincoln High School in 1920, and soon after moved to Hollywood to pursue a career in the fledgling film industry. She began working as a secretary for J. Charles Davis, president of El Dorado Productions, and from there was given a chance to write screenplays. She was married several times: first to Earl Brubaker, next to Gene Coleman, then to Raymond Hodges, and then Gordon Whitnall.

Selected filmography 
 West of Santa Fe (1928)
 Arizona Days (1928)
 Silent Trail (1928)

References 

1902 births
1969 deaths
American women screenwriters
Screenwriters from Nebraska
20th-century American women writers
20th-century American screenwriters